Helsinge is a town in Denmark.

Helsinge may also refer to: 

Helsinge (municipality), a former municipality of Frederiksborg County, Denmark
the Swedish name for the Finnish city of Vantaa until 1972
the Swedish name for Helsingin pitäjän kirkonkylä, a district of Vantaa